Pabaiskas is a small town in Ukmergė district of Vilnius County, Lithuania,  south-west of Ukmergė, with 249 inhabitants. The Battle of Vilkmergė took place here in 1435, when Sigismund Kestutaitis defeated Švitrigaila and his Livonian Order allies. Pabaiskas was built afterwards to commemorate the battle.

The word "pabaiskas" is derived from Polish "pobojowisko" literally meaning "battle site". Its alternate names include Pabaisko, Pabayskas, Pobojsk (Polish), and Paboisk (Yiddish).

There is a Holy Trinity Church in the town, built in 1436 by Sigismund Kestutaitis. A more modern stonework church was built in 1821–1836 m. The architect was J. Levoisier.

References

Towns in Lithuania
Towns in Vilnius County
Vilnius Voivodeship
Vilkomirsky Uyezd
Ukmergė District Municipality